Drive is a 2011 American action drama film directed by Nicolas Winding Refn. The screenplay, written by Hossein Amini, is based on James Sallis's 2005 novel of the same name. The film stars Ryan Gosling as an unnamed Hollywood stunt driver who moonlights as a getaway driver. He quickly grows fond of his neighbor, Irene (Carey Mulligan), and her young son, Benicio. When her debt-ridden husband, Standard (Oscar Isaac), is released from prison, the two men take part in what turns out to be a botched million-dollar heist that endangers the lives of everyone involved. The film co-stars Bryan Cranston, Christina Hendricks, Ron Perlman, and Albert Brooks.

Producers Marc Platt and Adam Siegel optioned the source novel after Siegel read a review from Publishers Weekly. Adapting the book proved to be challenging for Amini, as it had a nonlinear narrative. Gosling, one of Platt's top casting choices, eventually signed on for the lead, as he wanted to star in an action-oriented project. Gosling played a pivotal role in the film's production, which included hiring Refn as director and Beth Mickle as production designer. Newton Thomas Sigel oversaw the principal photography, which started on September 25, 2010, was shot on location in various parts of Los Angeles, and ended on November 12.

Before its September 2011 release, Drive had been shown at a number of film festivals, including the 2011 Cannes Film Festival, where it received a standing ovation. Refn won the festival's Best Director Award. The film was praised for its direction, cinematography, performances (particularly Gosling and Brooks'), visuals, action sequences, and musical score; however, some critics were appalled by its graphic violence and found that potentially detrimental to the film's box office success. Nonetheless, the film was still a commercial success, grossing $81 million against a production budget of $15 million. Several critics listed Drive as one of the best films of 2011, including the National Board of Review. Its honors include a nomination for Best Sound Editing at the 84th Academy Awards.

Plot

An unnamed man, known as "Driver", works as a mechanic, a stunt double, a stunt driver, and a criminal-for-hire getaway driver in Los Angeles, California. His jobs are all managed by auto shop owner Shannon, who persuades Jewish mobster Bernie Rose and his half-Italian partner Nino "Izzy" Paolozzi to purchase a car for the Driver to race. The Driver meets his new neighbor, Irene, and grows close to her and her young son, Benicio. Their relationship is interrupted when Irene's husband, Standard Gabriel, arrives after his release from prison. Standard owes protection money from his time in prison and is assaulted by Albanian gangster Chris Cook, who demands that Standard rob a pawn shop for $40,000 to pay off the debt, threatening that otherwise he will hurt Benicio and Irene. Learning this, the Driver offers to act as the getaway driver for the pawn shop robbery.

While the Driver is waiting outside the pawn shop with Blanche, Cook's accomplice, the store owner kills Standard. The Driver and Blanche are then pursued by another car. The Driver hides with Blanche in a motel where he learns that the pawn shop owner claims Standard was the sole perpetrator and no money was stolen. He threatens Blanche when she lies about being oblivious to the second car. She admits that the bag contains $1 million, and she and Cook planned to re-steal the money for themselves using the car that chased them. While Blanche is in the restroom, she is killed with a shotgun by one of Cook's henchmen. The Driver fatally stabs the gunman before killing another one with the shotgun.

At the auto shop, Shannon offers to hide the money, but the Driver declines. He tracks Cook to a strip club and threatens to kill him. Cook reveals that Nino was behind the robbery. The Driver calls him, offering to give back the money in exchange for being left out of the affair. Nino dismisses his offer, instead sending a hitman to the Driver and Irene's apartment building. The Driver tells an angry Irene about his involvement with her husband's death. When the pair enter an elevator, the Driver notices the hitman. He kisses Irene and then brutally stomps the hitman to death, horrifying Irene. Knowing that someone must have leaked the Driver's whereabouts for Nino to know his address, the Driver confronts Shannon, who reveals that he called Bernie to tell him about the money, in the process also unwittingly mentioning Irene. A furious Driver tells Shannon to flee, warning that Nino will surely now hunt them both.

At his pizzeria, Nino reveals to Bernie that a low-level Philadelphia mobster from the Italian "East Coast mob" stashed the money at the pawn shop with plans to use the money to set up a new operation. Since anyone tied to the robbery could lead the East Coast Italian Mafia to them, they need to kill everyone involved. He convinces Bernie to follow his plan. Bernie murders Cook, as he is the sole witness to their agreement. After Shannon refuses to divulge the whereabouts of the Driver at the auto shop, Bernie slashes his forearm with a straight razor, killing him.

Enraged and agonized at finding Shannon's corpse at the auto shop, the Driver disguises himself with a rubber stuntman's mask, follows Nino from the pizzeria to the Pacific Coast Highway and rams his car onto a beach. The Driver chases Nino towards the ocean and drowns him. He calls Irene and tells her that he will not return, also letting her know that she and Benicio were the best part of his life. The Driver meets Bernie, who promises that Irene will be safe in exchange for the money. Upon giving him the money, Bernie stabs him in the stomach before the Driver pulls out his own knife and stabs Bernie to death. The Driver manages to escape, while Bernie's corpse lies in the parking lot next to the cash. Irene knocks on the Driver's apartment door and walks away when no one answers. Although severely wounded, the Driver drives into the night.

Cast 
 Ryan Gosling as The Driver
 Carey Mulligan as Irene Gabriel
 Bryan Cranston as Shannon
 Albert Brooks as Bernie Rose
 Oscar Isaac as Standard Gabriel
 Christina Hendricks as Blanche
 Ron Perlman as Nino 'Izzy' Paolozzi
 Kaden Leos as Benicio Gabriel
 James Biberi as Chris Cook
 Jeff Wolfe as Assassin In The Tan Suit
 Russ Tamblyn as Doc
 Andy San Dimas as Dancer

Production

Development

The novel Drive by James Sallis was published in 2005. Producers Marc Platt and Adam Siegel of Marc Platt Productions optioned the novel after Siegel read a review in Publishers Weekly. The driver intrigued Siegel because he was "the kind of character you rarely see anymore  he was a man with a purpose; he was very good at one thing and made no apologies for it". The character interested Platt, because he reminded him of movie heroes he looked up to as a child, characters typically portrayed by Steve McQueen or Clint Eastwood.

Hossein Amini adapted the novel for the screen. He felt it was a rare book to receive from a studio because it was short, gloomy, and like a poem. Since the novel does not present a linear story, but has many flashbacks and jumps around in time, Amini found the adaptation challenging. He felt the non-linear structure made it "a very tricky structure" for a feature film.

A film adaptation of Drive was first announced in early 2008, with Neil Marshall set to direct what was being described as "an L.A.-set action mystery", planned as a starring vehicle for Hugh Jackman. Universal Studios, which had tried to make a film version for some time, was also on board. By February 2010, Marshall and Jackman were no longer attached to the project.

Producer Marc E. Platt contacted actor Ryan Gosling about Drive early on. Platt explained: "I have this list that I've created of very talented individuals whose work inspire me  writers, directors, actors whom I have to work with before I go onto another career or do something else with my life." Near the top of Platt's list was Gosling, who, despite having starred in several films of diverse genres, had never starred in anything like Drive. He had always been interested in doing an action-oriented project. Gosling said that he had been put off by the many current action genre films that focused more on stunts instead of characters. But he responded to Platt about two days later, as he was strongly attracted to the plot and the leading role of the unnamed driver. He thought the story had a "very strong character" at its core, and a "powerful" romance.

In an interview with Rotten Tomatoes, Gosling was asked what had attracted him to the film, and whether he had read the earlier script when Jackman and director Neil Marshall were attached to it. He said:
I think that might be the original one I read. I read a few drafts. I read one as well where he wasn't a stunt driver at all, which was a newer draft  maybe that's the one Hugh Jackman had; I'm not sure exactly. Basically when I read it, in trying to figure out who would do something like this, the only way to make sense of this is that this is a guy that's seen too many movies, and he's started to confuse his life for a film. He's lost in the mythology of Hollywood and he's become an amalgamation of all the characters that he admires. 

When Gosling signed on for the leading role, he was allowed to choose the director, a first in his career. The actor chose Danish filmmaker Nicolas Winding Refn, whose work he admired. He said, "It had to be [him]. There was no other choice."

When Refn read the first screenplay for Drive, he was more intrigued by the concept of a man having a split personality, being a stuntman by day and a getaway driver at night, than the plot of the story. Believing that the director might be intimidated by the script, as it was unlike anything he had done before, Gosling had concerns about whether Refn wanted to participate. Refn took on the project without hesitation.

Casting
When casting roles in his films, Refn does not watch casting tapes or have his actors audition for him. Instead, he meets with them, and casts them on the spot if he feels they are right. Drive was the first film that British actress Carey Mulligan signed on to do after being nominated for an Academy Award for her role in An Education (2009), which was directed by Lone Scherfig, also a Danish filmmaker. (Scherfig used to babysit Refn when he was a child, and they have become good friends). At the time of Mulligan's casting, Refn had not seen An Education. But his wife was a big fan of the film and Mulligan's performance, and she urged him to cast her. In the original script, the character was a Hispanic woman named Irina. The character was changed to Irene after Mulligan was cast; Refn said that he "couldn't find any actress that would click with [him] personally".

While working on the film, Refn had some cast and production members move in temporarily with him, his wife and two daughters in their home in Los Angeles. This included Carey Mulligan and Hossein Amini, the screenwriter. This enabled them to be immersed in the film. Refn and Amini made significant changes to the original script during this time.

Bryan Cranston plays the role of Shannon. Refn knew he wanted to cast Cranston, as he was a fan of his work in the TV series Breaking Bad. Knowing Cranston had other opportunities, Refn asked the actor how he would like to develop the role. After not hearing back, Refn called him; Cranston was just then writing the pros and cons of doing Drive for himself. Moved by Refn's interest, Cranston accepted the part. Christina Hendricks plays the small role of Blanche. "Trying to work in a more reality arena for a character like that," Refn originally auditioned porn stars for Blanche. He was unable to find anyone with the necessary acting talent. After meeting with Hendricks, he decided to cast her as he felt her persona would click with the character.

Albert Brooks plays the foul-mouthed, morose Bernie Rose. When Refn suggested him, Gosling agreed, but thought the actor might not want to play a character who is violent and sullen, or appear in a film that he did not work on himself. Brooks accepted the role to go against type, and because he loved that Bernie was not a cliché.

There are six people you could always get to play this kind of part, and I like that the director was thinking outside of the box. For me, it was an opportunity to act outside the box. I liked that this mobster had real style. Also, he doesn't get up in the morning thinking about killing people. He's sad about it. Upset about it. It's a case of, 'Look what you made me do.'

Nino, a key villain, is portrayed by Ron Perlman, one of the last actors to join the cast. Refn said, "The character of Nino was originally not particularly interesting, so I asked Ron why he wanted to be in my movie when he's done so many great films. When Perlman said, 'I always wanted to play a Jewish man who wants to be an Italian gangster', and I asked why, and he said, 'because that's what I am – a Jewish boy from New York', well, that automatically cemented it for me." Oscar Isaac portrays a Latino convict named Standard, who is married to Irene and is released from prison a week after Irene meets The Driver. Finding the role somewhat unappealing, he developed the archetypal character into something more.

He said of the role:
As soon as I sat down with Nicolas, he explained this universe and world of the story, so we made the character into someone interested in owning a restaurant, someone who made some wrong decisions in his life, ending up in a bad place. By making 'Standard' more specific and more interesting, we found that it made the story that more compelling.

Filming and cinematography
The film was made on a production budget of about $15 million and shot in various parts of Los Angeles, beginning on September 25, 2010. Locations were picked by Refn while Gosling drove him around the city at night. At the director's request, Los Angeles was picked as the shooting location due to budget constraints. Refn moved into a plush Los Angeles home and insisted that the cast members and screenwriter Amini move in with him. They would work on the script and film all day, then watch films, edit, or drive at night. Refn asked that the editing suite be placed in his home as well. With a shooting script of 81 pages, Refn and Gosling continued to trim down dialogue during filming.

The opening chase scene, involving Gosling's character, was filmed primarily by Refn within the car's interior. In an interview, he said he intended for this scene to emulate the feeling of a "diver in an ocean of sharks," and never left the vehicle during the car chase so that the audience can see what's happening from the character's point of view. Tight on money and time, he shot the scene in two days. With two different set-ups prepared in the car, the director found it difficult to have mobility with the camera, so he would switch the camera to two additional set-ups nearby. As downtown Los Angeles had been rejuvenated, Refn avoided certain areas to maintain the novel's gloomy atmosphere. The scene was shot at low angles with minimal light.

The elevator sequence was shot without dialogue. Refn explained:

Before shooting the head-smashing scene, Refn spoke to Gaspar Noé and asked him how he had done a similar scene in his film Irréversible (2002). Crossing the line from romance to violence, the scene begins with the Driver and Irene kissing tenderly. What they share is really a goodbye kiss. The Driver becomes a kind of "werewolf," violently stomping the hit man's head in. Irene sees the Driver in a new light.

Of this scene Refn said:
Every movie has to have a heart – a place where it defines itself – and in every movie I've made there's always a scene that does that. On Drive, it was hard for me to wrap my head around it. I realized I needed to show in one situation that Driver is the hopelessly romantic knight, but he's also completely psychotic and is willing to use any kind of violence to protect innocence. But that scene was never written. As I was going along, it just kind of popped up.

In March 2012, Interiors, an online journal concerned with the relationship between architecture and film, published an issue that discussed how space is used in this scene. The issue highlights Refn's use of constricted space and his way of creating a balance between romance and violence.

Using the Arri Alexa camera, cinematographer Newton Thomas Sigel shot the film digitally. According to executive producer David Lancaster, the film has abundant, evocative, intense images of Los Angeles that are not often seen. "From the little seen back streets of downtown LA to the dry arid outposts on the peaks of the desert landscape surrounding it, Siegel has re-imagined an LA all the way down to the rocky cliffs by the sea."

Car scenes were filmed with a "biscuit rig," a camera car rig developed for the film Seabiscuit (2003). It allowed stunt driver Robert Nagle to steer the car, freeing Gosling to concentrate on acting. Consistent with Refn's usual visual style, wide-angle lenses were used extensively by cinematographer Sigel, who avoided hand-held camera work. Preferring to keep the film more "grounded" and authentic, he also avoided the use of computer-generated imagery (CGI). Budget restrictions were also a factor in this decision.

Although many stunt drivers are credited, Gosling did some stunts himself, after completing a stunt driving car crash course. During the production, Gosling re-built the 1973 Chevrolet Malibu used in the film, taking it apart and putting it back together. Filming concluded on November 12, 2010.

Beth Mickle was hired as the film's production designer on Gosling's recommendation; they had worked together on 2006's Half Nelson. Prior to filming, Mickle supervised a crew of 40, routinely working 16- to 18-hour days. This was her most expensive film to date, and Mickle felt freer since "there was another zero added to the budget," compared to that of Half Nelson. The crew built the Driver's apartment building, which included a hallway and elevator that linked his unit to Irene's. Mickle also built a strip club set and Bernie Rose's apartment in an abandoned building. Turning a "run-of-the-mill" Los Angeles auto body shop into a grandiose dealership was one of the most challenging tasks. Painting the walls an electric blue color, she filled the showroom with vintage cars.

While Drive is set in the present day, it has a 1980s atmosphere, underlined by the vehicles, music, and clothes, and by the architecture. The parts of the city seen in the Valley and near downtown Los Angeles are cheap stucco and mirrored glass; the film excludes buildings constructed more recently. Drab background settings include the Southern California commercial strip. As the Los Angeles Times pointed out, whenever gleaming buildings are shown, it is because they are being seen from a distance. Refn shot those scenes from a helicopter at night in Bunker Hill, Los Angeles.

Music

Refn chose Johnny Jewel of Desire and Chromatics to score the film. The album consists of songs blended of electronic, ambient and retro music. Although Jewel's music was used in the score, at the last minute the studio hired composer Cliff Martinez to imitate the style and feel of Jewel's bands. Refn gave him a sampling of songs he liked and asked Martinez to emulate the sound, resulting in "a kind of retro, 80ish, synthesizer europop". Most of its ethereal electronic-pop score was composed by Martinez. The score contains tracks with vintage keyboards and bluntly descriptive titles.

Drive (Original Motion Picture Soundtrack) was released on CD on September 19, 2011, by Lakeshore Records. Prior to that, owing to viral reviews such as those found on Twitter, the soundtrack sold well on iTunes, climbing as high as number four on the sales charts. The album was released on vinyl in June 2012, by Mondo. It received positive response and peaked the soundtrack list from Billboard and Official Charts Company, while also peaked at 30th position on the US Billboard 200. A re-scored soundtrack for the film was produced for the BBC by Zane Lowe for its television broadcast in October 2014, which included original music from Chvrches, Banks, Bastille, Eric Prydz, SBTRKT, Bring Me the Horizon, The 1975 and Laura Mvula.

In September 2016, Lakeshore and Invada Records released a fifth anniversary special edition pressing of the soundtrack, featuring new liner notes and artwork. That same month, Johnny Jewel, College, Electric Youth, and Cliff Martinez discussed the impact of the soundtrack and film on their lives and contemporary music culture. Jewel told Aaron Vehling that Drives "blend of sonic and visual nostalgia with a contemporary spin is always deadly." The soundtrack was listed on Spin magazine's list of 40 Movie Soundtracks That Changed Alternative Music.

Release

Prior to beginning principal photography, Refn went to the 2010 Cannes Film Festival to sell the rights to Drive and released promotional posters for the film. In November 2010, FilmDistrict acquired North American distribution rights. The owners were so eager to get their hands on Drive, they started negotiating to buy it before seeing any footage, believing it could appeal to people who enjoy a genre movie, as well as the arthouse crowd. The film had a release date of September 16, 2011, in the United States.

The film premiered on May 20, in competition at the 2011 Cannes Film Festival. At its first showing the film received abundant praise and "some of the best responses of the festival," but Xan Brooks of The Guardian, who gave it a positive review, said it "can't win, won't win" Cannes's top prize. Brooks explained that "[I]t's too self-consciously retro, too much a series of cool, blank surfaces as opposed to a rounded, textured drama," but said that it was his "guilty pleasure" of the 2011 competition, labeling it an enjoyable affair. He said,

Over the past 10 days we've witnessed great art and potent social commentary; the birth of the cosmos and the end of the world. Turns out what we really wanted all along was a scene in which a man gets his head stomped in a lift. They welcome it in like a long-lost relation.

The film was greeted with hoots and howls of joy from the media, with viewers cheering on some of the scenes featuring extreme violence. Drive received a 15-minute standing ovation from the crowd. The festival awarded Refn best director for Drive.

Drive was screened at the Los Angeles Film Festival (LAFF) on June 20 at its gala screenings program. It was among more than 200 feature films, short projects, and music videos, from more than 30 countries, to be shown during the festival. After Red Dogs release date was pushed up by several days, Drive replaced it as the Melbourne International Film Festival's closing night film. The film was also screened during FilmDistrict's studio panel presentation at the San Diego Comic-Con function. A secret screening for Drive was held at London's Empire Big Screen during the middle of August. In September, Drive screened as a special presentation during the 2011 Toronto International Film Festival, alongside another film starring Gosling, The Ides of March.

Reception

Critical response

Review aggregator Rotten Tomatoes reports an approval rating of 93% based on 270 reviews, and an average rating of 8.30/10. The site's critical consensus states, "With its hyper-stylized blend of violence, music, and striking imagery, Drive represents a fully realized vision of arthouse action." Metacritic, another review aggregator, gave it a score of 78 out of 100, based on 43 critics, indicating "generally favorable reviews".

It was one of the highest-ranked, and most-featured, films on critics' year-end top 10 lists. It ranked as fourth-best film of the year, behind The Tree of Life, The Artist, and Melancholia on Metacritic's tally of top 10 lists. Drive was picked as the best film of the year by: Peter Travers of Rolling Stone, Richard Roeper of the Chicago Sun-Times, James Rocchi of BoxOffice, Joshua Rothkopf of Time Out (New York), Neil Miller of Film School Rejects, Mark Russell of The Oregonian, and a staff critic from Empire magazine.

The writers for the film magazine Empire listed Drive as their number one film of 2011. Peter Travers of Rolling Stone gave the film 4 out of 4 stars, declaring that Drive was "a brilliant piece of nasty business," and that "Refn is a virtuoso, blending tough and tender with such uncanny skill that he deservedly won the Best Director prize at Cannes." Travers also said, "Prepare to be blown away by Albert Brooks. Brooks' performance, veined with dark humor and chilling menace (watch him with a blade), deserves to have Oscar calling." The Wall Street Journals Joe Morgenstern also praised Brooks's performance, calling his villainous performance "sensational." James Rocchi of The Playlist gave the film an "A" letter grade, and wrote that "Drive works as a great demonstration of how, when there's true talent behind the camera, entertainment and art are not enemies but allies." Rocchi placed Drive as his number one film of 2011.

Movielines Stephanie Zacharek rated the film 9.5 out of 10, complimenting the film's action and writing that it "defies all the current trends in mainstream action filmmaking. The driving sequences are shot and edited with a surgeon's clarity and precision. Refn doesn't chop up the action to fool us into thinking it's more exciting than it is." She also admired Refn's skill in handling the film's violence, and the understated romance between Gosling and Mulligan. Drive was Roger Ebert's seventh best film of 2011. In praising the film, he wrote, "Here is a movie with respect for writing, acting, and craft. It has respect for knowledgeable moviegoers." Like Zacharek, Ebert admired the film's action sequences, which were practically made and did not rely on CGI effects.

Anthony Lane wrote in The New Yorker that Drives violence was far too graphic, and this ultimately was a detriment to the film. Referring to the violence, he said, "In grabbing our attention, he diverts it from what matters. The horror lingers and seeps; the feelings are sponged away." Michael Philips of the Chicago Tribune felt similarly, and said that although he enjoyed the film in the early sections, it became "one garishly sadistic set piece after another". Phillips thought the film relied too much on "stylistic preening" and did not have enough substance.

In 2014, The Huffington Post included Drive on its list of 8 Movies From The Last 15 Years That Are Super Overrated, with Bill Bradley criticizing the low amount of dialogue by Gosling's character and writing that "Refn spends all 100 minutes trying to convince you that he has a cool iPod playlist." 

Complex magazine criticized the film for whitewashing the character of Irene, who was a Latina in the source novel. 

Audiences polled by CinemaScore gave the film a score of "C−"; this was attributed to audiences feeling tricked, having expected more driving action based on the marketing.

Style and inspiration

Andrew O'Hehir of Salon magazine described Drive as a "classic Los Angeles heist-gone-wrong story," that "isn't trying to outdo Bullitt or get the next assignment in The Fast and the Furious franchise". O'Hehir also described homages to "Roger Corman's B-movie aesthetic and the glossy Hollywood spectacles of Michael Mann". Steven Zeitchik of the Los Angeles Times examined themes in the characters of "loyalty, loneliness and the dark impulses that rise up even when we try our hardest to suppress them". Reuters Nick Vinocur described a series of comic gore, resulting in "a bizarre concoction ... reminiscent of David Lynch's Mulholland Drive ... Quentin Tarantino's Pulp Fiction, and [with] angst-laden love scenes that would not be out of place in a Scandinavian drama". Christopher Hawthorne, also from the Los Angeles Times, has compared it to the works of Walter Hill, John Carpenter, Nathanael West, J. G. Ballard, and Mike Davis. According to Refn, Drive is dedicated to filmmaker Alejandro Jodorowsky and includes shades of Jodorowsky's existentialism.

Drive has been described as a tough, hard-edged, neo-noir, art house feature, extremely violent and very stylish, with European art and grindhouse influences. Drive also refers to 1970s and 1980s cult hits such as The Day of the Locust (1975) and To Live and Die in L.A. (1985). Other influences can be seen in the neon-bright opening credits and the retro song picks"a mix of tension-ratcheting synthesizer tones and catchy club anthems that collectively give the film its consistent tone". Drives title sequence is hot-pink, which was inspired by Risky Business (1983). Refn has also indicated that the film's romance was partly inspired by the films of writer-director John Hughes.

Refn's inspiration for Drive came partly from reading Grimms' Fairy Tales, and his goal was to make "a fairy tale that takes Los Angeles as the background," with The Driver as the hero. To play with the common theme of fairy tales, The Driver protects what is good while at the same time killing degenerate people in violent ways. Refn said Drive turns into a superhero film during the elevator scene when The Driver kills the villain. The director said he was also inspired by films such as Point Blank (1967), Two-Lane Blacktop (1971), The Driver (1978), and Thief (1981). Jean-Pierre Melville's crime productions influenced the cinematography. Amini's script imposes "a kind of sideways moral code," where even those who comply with it are almost never rewarded for their efforts, as seen when The Driver helps Standard because of concern for Irene and her son. In their vehicles, the characters not only make escapes or commit murder, but try to find peace and search for romance.

The Driver has been compared to the Man With No Name, a character Clint Eastwood portrayed in the Sergio Leone western, because he almost never speaks, communicating mostly non-verbally. The Driver's meager dialogue is not designed to present him as tough, but to soften him. Refn chose to give The Driver very little dialogue and have him drive around listening to synth-pop music, taking control when it counts. Peter Debruge of Variety opined that what The Driver lacks in psychology, he makes up through action and stylish costuming. The Driver's wardrobe, in particular the satin jacket with the logo of a golden scorpion on the back, was inspired by the band KISS, and Kenneth Anger's 1964 experimental film Scorpio Rising. Refn sees the former as the character's armor, and the logo as a sign of protection. According to reviewer Peter Canavese, the jacket is a reference to the fable of The Scorpion and the Frog, mentioned in the film, which evokes its use in the Orson Welles film Mr. Arkadin.

Drive would later serve as a major influence for many elements of the 2012 game Hotline Miami, including the minimalist plot, use of dialogue, portrayal of violence and musical style.

Box office
Drive grossed $78.1–81.4 million worldwide. In North America, the film grossed a total of $35.1 million. The film opened in North America earning $11.3 million on the weekend of September 16, 2011, and played at 2,866 theaters. Audiences polled by CinemaScore gave the film an average grade of "C−" on an A+ to F scale. It was one of four wide releases that opened that weekend, and came in second. The other three new releases included the re-release of The Lion King on 3D, which was the top film, along with the Straw Dogs remake and the romantic comedy I Don't Know How She Does It. The film closed its North American theatrical run on February 9, 2012.

In the international marketplace, Drive grossed $41.1–46.3 million. The film had its highest-grossing box office in France, where it earned a total of €10.3 million ($13.3 million). It opened in France on the weekend of October 5, 2011, at 246 theaters, eventually expanding to 360. The film opened in second place and had the highest per-screen theater gross for the weekend €10,722 ($13,746). Its second-highest overseas gross came in the United Kingdom, where it earned a total of £3.1 million ($4.6 million). Drive opened in the United Kingdom on September 27, 2011, at 176 theaters, eventually expanding to 190. The film opened in Australia on October 27, 2011, and grossed a total of $2.3 million in the country.

Accolades

Drive was nominated for four British Academy Film Awards, which included Best Film, Best Direction, Best Actress in a Supporting Role (Carey Mulligan), and Best Editing. It was one of the most-nominated films by critics' groups in 2011. Albert Brooks had the most critics' groups nominations. Refn won the Best Director Award at the 64th Cannes Film Festival. The film also received an Academy Award nomination for Best Sound Editing.

See also
 Heist films

References

External links

 
 
 
 
 
 

2011 films
2011 action drama films
2011 crime drama films
2011 crime thriller films
2011 independent films
2011 thriller drama films
2010s chase films
2010s heist films
American action drama films
American auto racing films
American chase films
American crime drama films
American crime thriller films
American gangster films
American heist films
American independent films
American neo-noir films
American thriller drama films
Bold Films films
FilmDistrict films
Films about automobiles
Films about stunt performers
Films about the American Mafia
Films based on American novels
Films directed by Nicolas Winding Refn
Films produced by Marc E. Platt
Films scored by Cliff Martinez
Films set in Los Angeles
Films shot in Los Angeles
Films with screenplays by Hossein Amini
Odd Lot Entertainment films
2010s English-language films
2010s American films
Postmodern films